The Vienna City Marathon is an annual marathon race over the classic distance of 42.195 km held in Vienna, Austria since 1984.

History
It is Austria's largest road running event and the 2010 edition had record participation with 32,940 runners from 108 nations taking part in the day's races. The race has been organised by Wolfgang Konrad since 1989.

The race day's events also include a marathon team relay event, a 4.2 km fun run and a half marathon. In 2011, Haile Gebrselassie ran the fastest ever time on Austrian soil for the half marathon distance. The 2012 edition saw Haile and Paula Radcliffe engage in a novel half marathon race, with Radcliffe receiving a head start 7:52 minutes (the difference between the two athletes personal bests). Gebrselassie crossed the finish line 3 minutes and 19 seconds ahead of Radcliffe.

Course 

The route starts at the Vienna International Centre, traverses the Reichsbrücke and the traffic junction Praterstern on the left side of the Donaukanal, then runs alongside the Ringstraße until reaching the Vienna State Opera. After crossing the left bank of the Wien river on Wienzeile to the Schönbrunn Palace, the route goes back to the Heldenplatz (via the Mariahilferstraße) where the half-marathon finishes. The full-marathon runners, however, are continuing past the Rathaus to the Alsergrund and to Friedensbrücke. The track continues via the left side of the Donaukanal and the Praterstern to reach the Prater again. After having passed the Ernst-Happel-Stadion and the Lusthaus, the route leads over the Franzensbrücke to the Ringstraße where the runners reach the finish at the Heldenplatz.

Winners

Key:
  Course record
  Austrian championship race

Marathon

Half marathon

Notes

References

List of winners
Vienna Spring Marathon. Association of Road Racing Statisticians (2009-04-20). Retrieved on 2010-02-17.

External links

 Official website
 Vienna City Marathon 2008  Every participant in a video

Marathons in Austria
Marathon
Recurring sporting events established in 1984
1984 establishments in Austria